Itaro Nakajima (13 March 1911 – 1993) was a Japanese sprinter. He competed in the men's 200 metres, the men's 4 x 100 meters relay, and the men's 4 x 400 meters relay events at the 1932 Summer Olympics events at the 1932 Summer Olympics.

References

1911 births
1993 deaths
Athletes (track and field) at the 1932 Summer Olympics
Japanese male sprinters
Olympic athletes of Japan
Place of birth missing
20th-century Japanese people